is a Japanese footballer who plays as a defensive midfielder for J1 League club Shonan Bellmare, on loan from Gamba Osaka.

Career

Kohei Okuno joined J1 League club Gamba Osaka in 2019 and was handed the number 26 jersey. Prior to that he spent 2 seasons on loan with Gamba Osaka Under-23 while he completed his high school education.    He played 4 games in 2017 and 2 more substitute appearances in 2018.

In March 2023, it was announced that Okuno would be joining Shonan Bellmare on a season-long loan.

Career statistics

Last update: 28 January 2019

Career statistics

Reserves performance

Last Updated: 2 December 2018

References

External links

2000 births
Living people
Association football people from Hyōgo Prefecture
Japanese footballers
J1 League players
J3 League players
Gamba Osaka players
Gamba Osaka U-23 players
Association football midfielders
Shonan Bellmare players